Lady Cynthia Blanche Mosley (née Curzon; 23 August 1898 – 16 May 1933), nicknamed "Cimmie", was a British aristocrat, politician and the first wife of the British Fascist politician Sir Oswald Mosley.

Early life 
Born Cynthia Blanche Curzon at Kedleston Hall, she was the second daughter of Hon. George Curzon (later Marquess Curzon of Kedleston) and his first wife, Mary Victoria Leiter, an American department-store heiress. As the daughter of an Earl (and later a Marquess), she was styled Lady Cynthia beginning in 1911.

Marriage and family
On 11 May 1920, Cynthia married the then-Conservative politician, Oswald Mosley. He was her first and only lover.

They had three children: 
Vivien Elizabeth Mosley (25 February 1921 – 26 August 2002), who on 15 January 1949 married Desmond Francis Forbes Adam who was killed in a car crash nine years later. 
Nicholas Mosley, 3rd Baron Ravensdale (25 June 1923 – 28 February 2017), a successful novelist who wrote a biography of his father and edited his memoirs for publication;
Michael Mosley (25 April 1932 – 13 March 2012), died unmarried and without issue.

Political life
Both Cynthia and Oswald Mosley joined the Labour Party in 1924. She was elected Labour Member of Parliament (MP) for Stoke-on-Trent in 1929, her husband having been elected MP for Smethwick in 1926. Frustrated with the ruling Labour Party's complacent and conservative response to high levels of unemployment, Oswald Mosley formed the New Party on 1 March 1931 which his wife also joined. The party failed to win any seats at the 1931 general election. After that Mosley started his move towards fascist policies, losing many of those who had joined the New Party as a result.

In September 1930, Lady Cynthia Mosley sent a letter to exiled communist and Bolshevik revolutionary, Leon Trotsky, whom she greatly admired, after flying to the Turkish island of Prinkipo, wanting to meet Trotsky. As Labour MP for Stoke-on-Trent, Lady Cynthia had tried and failed to get the British Labour government to offer Trotsky political asylum in Britain. Lady Cynthia's letter read:

Trotsky agreed to meet Lady Cynthia out of courtesy and curiosity, but he became very suspicious when Lady Cynthia said that her husband also admired him. While Oswald Mosley was still Labour MP for Smethwick and attacking Ramsay MacDonald from the left at the time, along with being seemingly the finest left-wing mind on the Labour government front bench, Trotsky was already suspicious of Oswald's impatience and ambition, labelling Oswald as the "aristocratic coxcomb". Trotsky was also critical of Lady Cynthia for the female companion she brought with her to the meeting. In 1935, Trotsky recalled his meeting with Lady Cynthia, expressing no surprise in her husband Oswald's subsequent journey over to the far-right and becoming the British leader of fascism, with Trotsky also questioning what became of Lady Cynthia personally and politically before "her sudden death" in 1933.

Husband's adultery
During their marriage, Lady Cynthia's younger sister, Lady Alexandra, was a mistress of Oswald Mosley, as was, briefly, their stepmother, Grace Curzon, Marchioness Curzon of Kedleston.

Electoral defeat and death
All the New Party's candidates in the 1931 election lost their seat or failed to win in constituencies, instead seeing a unified coalition government which involved the Conservatives, Liberals and a breakaway from the main Labour Party amid the Great Depression.  Cynthia Mosley herself did not stand in the election.  From then on she drifted away from her husband politically, having no sympathy for his move towards fascism. She died in 1933 at 34 after an operation for peritonitis following acute appendicitis, in London.

Styles
23 August – 20 October 1898: Miss Cynthia Blanche Curzon
20 October 1898 – 2 November 1911: The Hon. Cynthia Blanche Curzon
2 November 1911 – 11 May 1920: Lady Cynthia Blanche Curzon
1928 – 30 May 1929: Lady Cynthia Blanche Mosley
30 May 1929 – 27 October 1931: Lady Cynthia Blanche Mosley MP
27 October 1931 – 16 May 1933: Lady Cynthia Blanche Mosley

Sources
 De Courcy, Anne (2003) The Viceroy's Daughters, The Lives of the Curzon Sisters, HarperCollins;  (biography); retrieved 14 March 2007 
Mosley

Notes

References

1898 births
1933 deaths
English people of American descent
English people of Swiss descent
Daughters of British marquesses
Deaths from peritonitis
Labour Party (UK) MPs for English constituencies
Female members of the Parliament of the United Kingdom for English constituencies
People from Kedleston
UK MPs 1929–1931
Cynthia
20th-century British women politicians
Wives of baronets
Cynthia
20th-century English women
20th-century English people